Adenanthos filifolius is a species of erect shrub endemic to southwest Western Australia. It was first described by George Bentham in 1870.

References

External links
 
 

filifolius
Eudicots of Western Australia
Taxa named by George Bentham